Khash-Erdene Tuya (born 6 February 2001), is a Mongolian professional footballer who plays as a midfielder for the Mongolia national team.

He made his debut internationally on 25 March 2021, in a 2022 FIFA World Cup qualifying match against Tajikistan in a 3–0 loss.

On 30 March 2021, Tuya scored an own-goal in favour of Japan during a 14–0 defeat.

References

2001 births
Living people
Mongolian footballers
Association football midfielders
Mongolia international footballers